Ruth Thomas may refer to:
 Ruth Thomas (novelist) (born 1967), British novelist
 Ruth Thomas (children's writer) (1927–2011), English author of children's fiction